A. dubia may refer to:
 Amphisbaena dubia, L. Müller, 1924, a worm lizard species in the genus Amphisbaena

Synonyms
 Alcippe dubia, a synonym for Schoeniparus dubia, the rusty-capped fulvetta, a bird species found in Bhutan, China, India and Laos
 Amoeba dubia, a synonym for Polychaos dubium, a freshwater amoeboid
 Anguillulina dubia, a synonym for Tylenchorhynchus dubius, a plant pathogenic nematode

See also
 Dubia (disambiguation)